The 1992–93 season was Swindon Town's 6th consecutive season in the second tier of English football after winning promotion in 1986–87.

Season summary
Swindon won promotion to the Premier League and the top flight for the first time in the club's history after beating Leicester City in the play-off final at Wembley. Hoddle moved to Chelsea during the summer of 1993 and was replaced by assistant John Gorman.

Final league table

Results
Swindon Town's score comes first

Legend

Football League First Division

FA Cup

League Cup

Anglo-Italian Cup

Play-offs

References

Swindon Town F.C. seasons
Swindon Town